Calum Milan Best (born February 6, 1981) is a British-American television personality. He is the only child of footballer George Best.

Early life
Best was born in San Jose, California, the son of parents from the United Kingdom: Angie Best (born MacDonald-Janes), an English model, and George Best, the Northern Irish footballer. He was raised in Los Angeles, where he became a model in his mid-teens.

Best is a patron of the National Association for Children of Alcoholics ("Nacoa"), a UK charity providing support to children affected by a parent's drinking. He moved to his parents' native United Kingdom when he was 21.

Career

Best has taken part in the reality TV shows Fool Around With on E4 and The Match on Sky One. In 2005 and 2006, he was featured in ITV's Celebrity Love Island, winning the second series on August 28, 2006. Around this time he played himself in the final episode of ITV's Footballers' Wives. In September 2006, Best appeared in the ITV2 series Calum, Fran and Dangerous Danan, in which he was seen traveling with Paul Danan and Fran Cosgrave from Texas to Los Angeles on America's U.S. Route 66.

In late 2006, Best launched a men's fragrance called "Calum", made by Jigsaw ESL. Best also launched fragrances called "Best" and "Day and Night".

In 2008, Best appeared on RTÉ's Livin' with Lucy. Later that year, he featured in MTV's Totally Calum Best. The show detailed Best's attempts to remain celibate for fifty days.

In 2009, he appeared as a guest judge in the reality television show Paris Hilton's British Best Friend, in which he tested the contestants' flirting abilities. In November 2009, he presented the BBC TV Documentary Brought up By Booze: A Children in Need Special, which highlighted the plight of children brought up by alcoholic parents. Best drew upon his relationship with his own father in the making of the program, which the BBC described as a 'raw and often distressing journey'.

In 2010, Best appeared in Channel 4's Come Dine with Me, where he dined with Janice Dickinson, Samantha Fox and presenter Jeff Brazier.

Calum hosted via webcam an Online bingo session at Bingocams UK on April 20, 2012.

In 2012, he won Celebrity Bainisteoir, managing Moy Davitts of Mayo.

In January 2015, he took part in the fifteenth series of Channel 5 reality series Celebrity Big Brother. He came third.
 
In 2016, Best was a member of the cast of the E! series Famously Single, which follows eight single celebrities in their search for love. He also returned for the second season of Famously Single which premiered June 25, 2017.

On January 3, 2017, he returned to compete on the nineteenth series of Celebrity Big Brother, in which he finished in seventh place.

On March 22, 2017, he presented the documentary My Best, directed by Luigi Maria Perotti.

In 2017, Best appeared in third series of Celebs Go Dating.

In 2020, Best appeared in Ex on the Beach of Ex on the Beach.

In 2022, Best appeared in and jointly won the fourth series of Celebrity SAS: Who Dares Wins. Described as a "brutal" final, 3 other surviving celebrity contestants also won the shows final tasks.

Filmography

References

External links
 

1981 births
Living people
Male models from California
Television personalities from Los Angeles
American people of English descent
American people of Northern Ireland descent
American male models
American television personalities
George Best
People from San Jose, California